

See also 

 Badass (disambiguation)